The 1987–88 season of the Venezuelan Primera División, the top category of Venezuelan football, was played by 14 teams. The national champions were Marítimo.

Results

First stage

Final Stage

External links
Venezuela 1988 season at RSSSF

1987–88
1987 in South American football leagues
1988 in South American football leagues
1987–88 in Venezuelan football